Beth Sholom Congregation and Talmud Torah (BSCTT) is a Modern Orthodox synagogue on Seven Locks Road in Potomac, Maryland. The largest Orthodox synagogue in the Washington metropolitan area, it is led by Rabbi Nissan Antine.

Religious services and programs
Beth Sholom Congregation holds morning and evening tefillah services, Shabbat services, High Holidays services, and Shalosh Regalim services.

Beth Sholom Congregation hosts adult education classes and study groups. The congregation has a men's club, a sisterhood, and a social action committee. Beth Sholom hosts classes for school-age children and teenagers as well. while Beth Sholom Early Childhood Center has classes for younger children.

Leadership
Rabbi Nissan Antine has been with Beth Sholom Congregation since 2006, when he became its assistant rabbi. Antine was promoted to senior rabbi in July 2013 when Rabbi Joel Tessler left to move to Israel. Since then, Tessler has been rabbi emeritus of Beth Sholom Congregation.

Maharat Hadas Fruchter served as the assistant spiritual leader of Beth Sholom Congregation from 2016 through 2019.

History

Origins
The congregation was founded in 1908 as Voliner Anshe Sfard. It initially worshiped in a congregant's house, but soon purchased a store and remodeled it as a synagogue building, with separate men and women sections. Within just a few years of its creation, the congregation had bought its own cemetery.

The Voliner Anshe Sfard Congregation joined with the Har Zion Congregation in 1936 under the name Beth Sholom Congregation and Talmud Torah, complete with its own Hebrew school.

Two years later, the combined congregation spent $100,000 on a new building. The new building, located at Eighth and Shepherd streets in Petworth, Washington, D.C., was dedicated on August 14, 1938, and served the community for 18 years.

Move to Shepherd Park
The congregation sold the Eighth and Shepherd building to the Allegheny Conference Association of Seventh-day Adventists and moved out of the building on December 24, 1954. The congregation temporarily moved to a former bank building at Alaska and Georgia avenues in Shepherd Park, and religious classes were temporarily held at Sixteenth Street and Fort Stevens Drive NW in Brightwood, while it built a new building at Thirteenth Street and Eastern Avenue NW in Shepherd Park. Construction of the new building on Eastern Avenue cost $900,000.

The congregation held its first religious services in the new building on September 14, 1954. The new building had seating for 2,000 worshippers. At one point, the Hebrew school had more than 400 students.

Move to Potomac
By 1975, many of the members of the congregation had moved to Montgomery County, Maryland, and only one-fifth of the seats in the sanctuary were filled for Shabbat services. The congregation's leadership decided to build a chapel and a religious school on Seven Locks Road in Potomac. It was considered a branch synagogue. The new location in Potomac worked out; the congregation's membership increased by ten percent, and the religious school's enrollment increased ten-fold.

In the late 1980s, Beth Sholom was principally responsible for the construction of a two-mile-long eruv in Potomac that made it permissible for observant Orthodox Jews to carry and push objects within the boundaries area on Shabbat, leading to the growth of the Orthodox population in the area.

In order to accommodate its large community, the congregation constructed a new building on the Potomac site in 1994. In 1999, the second phase of the building was completed.

2005 to present
In 2005, the synagogue became the first Orthodox congregation in Washington to elect a woman as president of the congregation.

As of 2012, the congregation numbered more than four-hundred families.

References

External links

1908 establishments in Maryland
Ashkenazi Jewish culture in Maryland
Ashkenazi synagogues
Modern Orthodox Judaism in Maryland
Modern Orthodox synagogues in the United States
Orthodox synagogues in Maryland
Potomac, Maryland
Jewish organizations established in 1908
Sephardi Jewish culture in Maryland
Sephardi synagogues
Shepherd Park
Synagogues in Montgomery County, Maryland
Synagogues completed in 1994
Synagogues completed in 1999